Nocardioides gilvus is a Gram-positive, facultatively anaerobic and non-motile bacterium from the genus Nocardioides which has been isolated from the Namtso Lake, Tibet.

References 

 

gilvus
Bacteria described in 2017